Telkom University (Indonesian: Universitas Telkom, abbreviated as Tel-U) is a private university located in Bandung Regency, West Java, Indonesia. Tel-U has several times ranked as the top private university in Indonesia and has been ranked to be one of The Best Universities in Indonesia. Tel-U also became Indonesia's First Private University to be accredited "Excellent" by BAN-PT.

Established on August 14, 2013, with four institutions that were under Telkom Indonesia through its education-focused wing, Telkom Education Foundation (now Telkom Foundation),  were merged to form the university. These four forming institutions were the Telkom Institute of Technology (Institut Teknologi Telkom), Telkom Institute of Management (Institut Manajemen Telkom), Telkom Polytechnic (Politeknik Telkom) and the Telkom College of Art and Design Indonesia (Sekolah Tinggi Seni Rupa dan Desain Indonesia Telkom). The university, like its preceding institutions, maintains links with hundreds of companies, many of which are in the telecommunications sector.

History

Establishment of STT Telkom and MBA Bandung
Indonesia's largest state-owned company in telecommunication, Telkom Indonesia was then led by Chief Director Ir. Cacuk Sudarijanto founded the Telkom College of Technology (STT Telkom) and the MBA Bandung in 1990. These are the first universities in Indonesia that specialize in education in the telecommunications and information technology industries. STT Telkom unveiled its foundation on Friday, September 28, 1990, in London Downstream Gegerkalong by the Minister of Tourism, Post and Telecommunications at the time, Susilo Sudarman. STT Telkom has been under the Telkom Education Foundation (YPT) since its establishment.

The purpose of the rapid establishment of STT Telkom is to meet the needs of experts in the telecommunications industry. Telkom is very interested in the institution, so it provides full scholarships to students for the 1991 and 1992 classes. The existence of climate change in the telecommunications industry and with the start of Telkom Indonesia entered the era of going public, the scholarship program and bulk bond subsequently terminated and STT Telkom became an independent college.

At the beginning stands, the STT Telkom campus is spread over three locations, Campus-1 in Jalan Soekarno Hatta, Campus-2 in Jalan Hilir Gegerkalong and Campus-3 in Jalan Haji Hasan Mustafa Penhollow. MBA first-Bandung is Building H and I Telkom Training Center Complex located at 47 Lower Street Gegerkalong Bandung. In 1993, STT Telkom has its campus on Canal Street Buahbatu Telecommunications called Bandung Technoplex area and a year later all teaching and learning activities centered on the new campus. Bandung Technoplex area was inaugurated by the President of the Republic of Indonesia Suharto on March 24, 1994. In the past, the area was the location of the second oldest radio transmitter station in Indonesia belonging to the Dutch Colonial Government, which later participated in broadcasting the news of the Proclamation of Independence of the Unitary State of the Republic of Indonesia on August 17, 1945, to various parts of the world.

At the beginning of its establishment, the MBA Bandung fully adopted the Asian Institute of Management (AIM) Philippines schooling system. In 1994, MBA Bandung changed to the College of Management Bandung (STMB). Responding to government regulations regarding the management of the implementation of the MBA program in Indonesia, in the same year, MBA-Bandung changed its organizational form into a High School by the name London School of Management and changed the program into a Master of Management program. In 1997 STMB organized Bachelor programs. The study program that was opened at STMB at that time was the Bachelor of Business Management in Telecommunication and Informatics (MBTI).

In 2004 STMB changed to the College of Business Management Telkom (Telkom STMB). STT Telkom improve its organizational form into Telkom on November 20, 2007 and changed its name to Telkom Institute of Technology (Institut Teknologi Telkom or IT Telkom) in 2008.

Establishment of Telkom Polytechnic and STISI Telkom
On September 27, 2007, Telkom Polytechnic was inaugurated by the President Director of Telkom Indonesia, Rinaldi Firmansyah. Telkom Polytechnic's course of history stems from two training programs engaged in the field of ICT, namely STT Telkom Professional Program and NIIT & Telkom Center. Both training institutions are then merged to form a new higher education institution engaged in the field of vocational education.

In 2008, Telkom transformed STMB Telkom into the Telkom Institute of Management (IM Telkom). Transformation is characterized by the increase in courses organized by IM Telkom.

In February 2010, the School of Indonesian Art and Design (STISI) that one of the pioneer universities in the field of art and design in Indonesia joined Telkom Education Foundation and changed its name to Telkom Indonesia College of Art and Design (STISI Telkom). STISI was established on 2 September 1990, by Usnadibrata and Dedeh Usnadibrata under the Mandiri Indonesia Education Foundation (Yayasan Pendidikan Mandiri Indonesia).

Telkom University mergered
Since 2009, there has been a plan to merge the four universities under the Telkom Education Foundation (Yayasan Pendidikan Telkom), namely the Telkom Institute of Technology, the Telkom Institute of Management, Telkom Polytechnic and the Telkom Indonesia College of Art and Design. It was initially planned that the four institutions would be merged into one university in 2012. But due to several problems the merge was delayed to 2013.

On August 14, 2013, Telkom University was established based on the Decree of the Director General of Higher Education of the Ministry of Education and Culture Number 309/E/0/2013. On August 31, 2013, Telkom University was inaugurated by the Minister of Cultural Education of the Republic of Indonesia, Muhammad Nuh, at the Telkom University Convention Hall, by presenting the first Chancellor of Telkom University, Mochamad Ashari, who is a Professor of Electrical Engineering at the Sepuluh Nopember Institute of Technology, Surabaya.

In merging into Telkom's University in 2013, Each of the four schools formed a faculty inside the university. IT Telkom was transformed into the Telkom Engineering School (TES). Subsequently, in 2014 TES developed into three faculties, namely the School of Electrical Engineering (SEE), the School of Industrial Engineering (SIE) and the School of Computing (SC). IM Telkom transformed into the Telkom Economics and Business School (TEBS). Subsequently, in 2014, TEBS developed into two faculties, namely the School of Economics and Business (SEB)and the School of Communications and Business. Telkom Polytechnic transformed into the Telkom Applied Science School (TASS). Subsequently, in 2014 was changed to the School of Applied Science (SAS). STISI Telkom was transformed into a Faculty that was named Telkom Creative Industries School (TCIS). Subsequently, in 2014 was changed to the School of Creative Industries (SCI).

The Telkom University campus is located in the Bandung Technoplex area. The campus is a development of the STT Telkom campus. Telkom University has the abbreviation Tel-U and the motto of "Creating the Future" which was initiated by Arief Yahya, President Director of Telkom Indonesia when Telkom University was established.

Academics and administration

Rector
The highest formal leader of Telkom University is a Rector, currently Adiwijaya. The Rector carries out his duties and is responsible to the Chairman of the Foundation. List of rectors who have served:

 Prof. Ir. Mochamad Ashari, M.Eng., Ph.D. (2013–2018)
 Prof. Dr. Adiwijaya, S.Si., M.Sc. (2018–present)

Directorate
The Telkom University Directorate is functionally under the Vice-Rector. The main responsibility of the Directorate and Unit is to assist the leadership of Telkom University in carrying out academic activities and services at the university level.

 Directorate of Secretariat & Strategic Plannings
 Directorate of Bandung Techno Park
 Directorate of Academic
 Directorate of Postgraduate and Advance Learning
 Directorate of Information Technology Center
 Directorate of Human Resources
 Directorate of Logistic and Assets
 Directorate of Finance
 Directorate of Career, Alumni, & Endowment Development
 Directorate of Student Affairs
 Directorate of Marketing and Admission
 Directorate of Strategic Partnership & International Office
 Directorate of Research and Community Service

Faculties and study programs
Telkom University organizes 34 study programs managed by seven faculties, where two study programs implement PJJ (distance education) and there are ten international class study programs.

International programs
 School of Economics and Business
 International ICT Business
 School of Industrial Engineering
 Industrial Engineering
 Information System
 School of Electrical Engineering
 Electrical Engineering
 Telecommunication Engineering
 School of Computing
 Informatics Engineering
 School of Communication and Business
 Business Administration
 Communication Science
 School of Creative Industries
 Visual Communication Design

Expertise group
The Expertise Group at Telkom University is a functional group of lecturers in certain scientific disciplines and experts who are in cognate scientific units in the form of faculties, with the implementers of scientific and expertise functions being lecturers. The function of the Expertise Group is to carry out scientific and expertise development activities through the Tridharma of the University and its supports, such as supporting the implementation of education in study programs, planning and implementing various research programs, as well as planning and implementing various programmatic public service and community service activities.

Every Telkom University lecturer is incorporated in an Expertise Group as a forum for the development of the academic community and becomes the main resource in the faculty.

Laboratories and studios
In supporting various educational activities (practicum and preparation of student final works) as well as lecturers' research, Telkom University develops laboratories and studios spread across all faculties, PPDU and the Postgraduate Directorate, with a total of 48 in SEE, twelve in SIE, eleven at SOC, eight at SEB, four at SCB, twelve at SCI, twelve at SAS, one postgraduate studio and two basic labs at PPDU, bringing a total of 110 laboratories and studios.

The entire building has functioned for the implementation of the Tridharma of the University (education, research and for community service), by lecturers who are members of their respective expertise groups or by students with the guidance of lecturers. In addition to technical support for the implementation of educational programs that play a role in transforming students into experts, this laboratory and studio also function for research that results in the productivity of scientific publications to various countries as well as international scientific forums from the results of research conducted by the academic civitas.

Research centers
Human Centric Engineering (HUMIC)
Advanced Creative Networks (AdCNet)
ICT Business and Public Policy
Digital Business Ecosystem
Advanced Wireless Technology (AdWiTech)
Supply Chain Research Center(eSCRC)

Library

The Technical Implementation Unit (UPT) of the Telkom University Library which is located on the 3-4-5 floor of the Learning Center Building is one of the supporting facilities in providing various information to carry out the Tri Dharma of the University. The Telkom University library is developed as a Knowledge Management Center where there are curricular library collections, research-supporting library collections, general insight and literature collections, national literature collections, global insight library collections and others, with the number of library titles and the minimum number of collections following the provisions of the National Higher Education Standards (SNPT).

In September 2016, Telkom University launched the Telkom University Open Library, with more than 14,000 final assignments that can be accessed online for free. Telkom University Open Library is a brand for the Telkom University Library & Scientific Resources Unit which is under Vice Rector III.

Language center
Telkom University Language Center provides various language services, namely:

Various kinds of English courses
SAP (English Self-Access Program), is a learning service that can be accessed by campus residents via telephone during working days and hours.
Language Test: English Proficiency Test (EPT), English Communicative Competence Test (ECCT), Institutional Testing Program - The Test of English as a Foreign Language (ITP TOEFL).
Special Services: Translation (Indonesian, English, Japanese), Proofreading for International Journals, In-House Language Training, Language Seminars & Workshops.
Various other foreign language courses: French, Japanese, Korean, Arabic, etc.

Electronic learning (e-Learning)
Telkom University provides e-Learning facilities that support lectures as a learning supplement tool. The technology and learning materials used for this e-Learning facility are developed through various continuous activity programs, which involve the Tel-U Academic Council and reviewers, which consist of professors and education experts from various partner universities of Telkom University. The commitment to the development of e-Learning facilities is part of the implementation of Telkom University's CELOE (Center of e-Learning and Open Education) initiative. Telkom University's e-Learning application is called iDea (Integrated Distance Education Application), which is currently accessible through Telkom University's information system portal, iGracias (Tel-U Integrated Information System). In addition, to support these online learning activities, Telkom University also implements an Open Library and several certifications in the field of computing.

Locations and buildings

BT-Plex campus
The BT-Plex Campus is the central campus of Telkom University. The campus is located in the Dayeuhkolot area, Bandung Regency, precisely on Jalan Telekomunikasi - Buahbatu, Bandung Technoplex (BT-Plex) area. All faculties and academic facilities as well as supporting facilities are located on this campus.

Gegerkalong campus
Gegerkalong Campus, located in the Gegerkalong Hilir area, north of Bandung City, to be precise in the Telkom Indonesia office complex. On this campus, there is one building for the implementation of the Master of Management Study Program and the international class of the Management Study Program (International ICT Business).

Campus facilities

Joint lecture halls with 10 floors and also "Graha Wiyata Cacuk Sudarijanto" with lecture halls in faculties of more than 100 classes. Telkom also has a TULT lecture building (Telkom University Landmark Tower), one of the public lecture buildings. This building also functions as a lecture building for three faculties, namely the Faculty of Industrial Engineering, the Faculty of Informatics and the Faculty of Electrical Engineering. Consisting of 19 floors, this building is the tallest lecture building in West Java. TULT is a smart building that carries an environmentally friendly concept. In addition to the administrative office, this building is also equipped with infrastructure with hybrid learning methods (a combination of online and face-to-face methods) and also has a laboratory.
Telkom University Convention Hall (TUCH), Multipurpose Building and SEE-SIE-SOC Auditorium, as well as SEB-SCB, SCI and SAS Halls.
Dormitory, First-year undergraduates are required to live on campus. It has facilities in the form of rooms, prayer rooms, a field, a lobby, a function room, internet, security officers and a parking area.
Ceremony infrastructure and sports fields such as tennis courts, indoor basketball, badminton, indoor and outdoor futsal, running tracks, climbing towers and student center buildings.
Trade areas such as the Business Center, FIT and FIK faculty canteens, Bamboo canteens, dormitory canteens, Honesty Canteens (Cacuk Sudarijanto Building), Citra Cooperatives and student cooperatives, as well as T-Mart minimarkets.
Syamsul 'Ulum Mosque, a main mosque on the Telkom University campus with a capacity of up to 6000 people. The Syamsul 'Ulum Mosque is located in the Telkom University campus complex, founded on September 28, 1994, which was marked by the erection of the first pillar by the then Minister of Education and Culture of the Republic of Indonesia, Wardiman Djojonegoro. This mosque was inaugurated on May 29, 1996, by the then Minister of Research and Technology, B. J. Habibie, who said that there was no need for a dichotomy between science and technology and religious knowledge.
Student Clinic, is a health service center for all students and the academic community, namely Telkomedika. Telkomedika is a subsidiary of Yakes Telkom which was established in 2008. The facilities provided by Telkomedika Health services include First Level Outpatient Services (General and Dental Clinics), Advanced Outpatient Services (specialist doctors, laboratory examinations, physiotherapy, etc.), Inpatient Services using referrals from First Level Outpatient Services or Advanced Outpatient Services referrals from First Level Outpatient Services. The Telkomedika Clinic room at Telkom University is also equipped with medical equipment.
Infiltration Lake and Telkom University Plaza, integrated with a green environmental management system and water resource management within the framework of a green campus commitment. In addition to having a campus forest and drainage system, at Telkom University there is also an infiltration lake equipped with a plaza and running track as open public space. The lake plaza which is located in the middle of the campus area also functions as a junction that connects all areas of the faculty complex. In this plaza and lake area, various outdoor art activities are often held, among others, it was used to organize a culture night event which was part of the implementation of ICoICT 2013 (International Conference on Information and Communication Technology) attended by key speakers and speakers from Indonesia. from 30 countries across continents as well as public officials.

International conference
Telkom University has several times hosted several international scientific conferences organized by each faculty according to their scientific family. The scientific conference is held in collaboration with international scientific or professional organizations according to the faculty of science clumps, so that scientific publications at the conference are published in the scientific repository of international scientific or professional organizations, such as IEEE, Global Illuminators, and so on, and are indexed on the citation of scientific publication portals. reputation, such as Scopus, Copernicus, Science Direct and others.

The holding of international scientific conferences by Telkom University is an open scientific dissemination vehicle for exchanging research results for researchers between universities, research institutes and industries from various countries and Indonesia with those produced by Telkom University lecturers and researchers.

 International Conference of Information and Communication Technology (ICoICT), School of Computing
 Asia Pacific Conference on Wireless and Mobile (APWiMob), School of Electrical Engineering
 International Conference on Industrial Automation, Information and Communication Technology (IAICT), School of Electrical Engineering
 International Conference on Aerospace Electronics and Remote Sensing Technology (ICARES), School of Electrical Engineering
 International Seminar and Conference on Learning Organization (ISCLO), School of Economics and Business
 International Conference on Global Trends in Academic Research (GTAR), School of Economics and Business
 International Conference on Emerging Trends in Academic Research (ETAR), School of Communication and Business
 International Conference on Data and Information Science (ICoDIS), School of Computing
 Bandung Creative Movement (BCM), School of Creative Industries

Accreditations and rankings

Accreditations
Telkom University is Indonesia's First Private University Accredited Excellent by BAN-PT, based on the Decree of the National Accreditation Board for Higher Education (BAN-PT) No. 407/SK/BAN-PT/AK-ISK/PT/2021 in 2021. Telkom University also received a 4 Star Rating by QS Star and is the only University that has International Information Technology Certification in Indonesia (ISO 20000-1: 2018). In addition, Tel-U has achieved international accreditations including ASIC, IABEE and ABEST21.

The following is the BAN-PT accreditation for study programs at Telkom University:

Rankings
Telkom University has several times been ranked as the best private university in Indonesia and one of the best universities in Indonesia. The following is the ranking of Telkom University in the last six years:

Achievements

Telkom University students have achieved various achievements both nationally and internationally. Several international competitions won by Tel-U students include ARToolkit Emerging Ar Developers' Contest 2016, SAFMC 2018, E2FEST 2019, Huawei ICT Competition Southern Pacific 2018-2019, JDIE 2019, ISTEC 2020, WINTEX 2020, WSEEC 2021 and other competitions ATU-Net Hackathon 2021.

Student life
Telkom University students are required to participate in various student organizations that are recorded in a Student Activity Transcript (TAK). The areas of student organization include Student Activities (Ormawa), Student Activity Units (UKM), Basic Organizational Leadership Training (LDKO), leadership, careers/pre-professional, ethnic/cultural, sports, entrepreneurship, health and counselling, media and publications, the arts and religious organizations.

Alumni
Telkom University Alumni formed an organization called Telkom University Alumni Forum, in Indonesian it is called Forum Alumni Universitas Telkom (FAST). FAST was declared an Alumni organization at the university level on October 2, 2014. This declaration was attended by representatives of Telkom University alumni and four other Telkom universities before joining Telkom University.

With this declaration, the Telkom University Alumni Forum (FAST) has now become an association consisting of all Telkom University Alumni and members of Alumni associations that existed before the merger, namely the Telkom Institute of Technology Alumni Forum, Telkom Management Institute Alumni Association, STISI Telkom Alumni Association and Telkom Applied Science School Alumni Association.

In every Telkom University Senate Open Session for graduation, after the inauguration procession of graduates by the Chairman of the Senate and the reading of graduates' promises, a symbolic tradition of handing over data on graduates who become new alumni to the President of FAST is carried out.

References

External links

Telkom University Alumni Forum

Bandung Regency
Educational institutions established in 2013
Universities in West Java
2013 establishments in Indonesia